Lucienne Bloch (January 5, 1909 – March 13, 1999) was a Switzerland-born American artist.  She was best known for her murals and for her association with the Mexican artist Diego Rivera, for whom she produced the only existing photographs of Rivera's mural Man at the Crossroads, painted in 1933 and destroyed in January 1934 at Rockefeller Center in New York City.

Career

Background

Bloch was born in Geneva, Switzerland, the youngest child of composer and photographer Ernest Bloch. In 1917, the Bloch family emigrated to America.

A multi-talented artist, Lucienne attended the École nationale supérieure des Beaux-Arts in Paris at 14, apprenticing with sculptor Antoine Bourdelle and painter Andre Lhote. Her close friend Beniamino Bufano also influenced her sculpture.

With Diego Rivera and Frida Kahlo

In 1929, she pioneered the design of glass sculpture for the Royal Leerdam Crystal Glass Factory in the Netherlands. When Frank Lloyd Wright saw her glass works and spoke with her in New York, he invited her to teach at his architectural school, Taliesin East, where she worked with artist and muralist Santiago Martínez Delgado and other Taliesin fellows.

Then, in 1931, Bloch had met and began her apprenticeship with Diego Rivera on his frescoes in New York (1931, 1933) and Detroit (1932). She also formed a close friendship with Rivera's wife Frida Kahlo, and they became each other's companion and confidant. In 1932 she accompanied Kahlo to Mexico when Kahlo's mother became ill. She was also with Kahlo in Detroit when Kahlo had her miscarriage.

A prolific photographer, Bloch contributed many photographs of Rivera and Kahlo to biographical works about them. She took the only existing photographs of Rivera's (controversially) destroyed mural, Man at the Crossroads, in Rockefeller Center Plaza in New York City. She created five portfolios of photographs of Rivera and Kahlo, including photos of Kahlo's paintings in progress, and the artists in New York City, Detroit, and Mexico. The apprentices there were:  Bloch, Stephen Pope Dimitroff, Lou Block, Arthur Niendorf, Seymour Fogel, Hideo Noda, and Antonio Sanchez Flores.

With Stephen Pope Dimitroff

On September 5, 1936, Lucienne married Stephen Pope Dimitroff, one of Rivera's chief plasterers. Together they created fresco murals all over the United States.

From 1935 to 1939, Bloch was employed by the WPA/FAP (Works Progress Administration/Federal Arts Project). As a WPA/FAP artist, she completed murals for public buildings, including the House of Detention for Women in New York City,  and the Fort Thomas, Kentucky post office. She also worked free-lance as a photographer for Life magazine.  For Life she record the desperate conditions of autoworkers during labor strikes and protests that occurred throughout the U.S. during the formation of automobile worker unions.

She and Dimitroff created nearly 50 murals across the United States for religious institutions, schools, hospitals, and businesses. Dimitroff died in 1996 on their farm in Gualala, California.

Works

Art

Bloch worked in many types of media: photography, fresco, woodblock cuts, lithographs, mosaics, egg tempera, watercolor, wood and glass sculpture, terra cotta, portraits in ink, gesso, and oil.

Bloch’s most significant work exists as a 1000 square foot mural painted inside the back wall of the Temple Emanuel Synagogue in Grand Rapids, Michigan. Mostly neutral in tone with some golden yellows and muted oranges, this abstract mural stands as a beautiful testament to modern art.(The Conservation Center, http://www.theconservationcenter.com/articles/2628056-lucienne-from-the-bloch-conserving-a)

Illustrated books

She also illustrated numerous children's books, of which the Library of Congress lists:
 I Want to Fly, by Anita Brenner, (1943)
 Willie's Walk to Grandmama, by Margaret Wise Brown and Rockbridge Campbell (1944)
 Keep Singing, Keep Humming: A Collection of Play and Story Songs, by Margaret Bradford Boni (1946)
 Smart Little Boy and His Smart Little Kitty, by Louise Woodcock (1947)
 Is it Hard?  Is it Easy? by Mary McBurney Green (1948)
 Everybody Eats, by Mary McBurney Green (1950)
 Sandpipers, Edith Thacher Hurd (1961)
 Starfish, Edith Thacher Hurd (1962)

Private life

Bloch married Dimitroff in 1936 in Flint, Michigan.

They had three children; George Ernest Dimitroff, born July 22, 1938, Pencho Bloch Dimitroff, born August 3, 1941, and Sita Dimitroff (Milchev) born December 25, 1943.

Dimitroff died in 1996, and was followed by Bloch in 1999; both died on their small farm in Gualala in Northern California.

Legacy

One grandchild, her namesake, Lucienne Allen, maintains her legacy from the family farm, "Old Stage Studios," in Gualala.

References

External links

 Lucienne Bloch on Artsy
Columbus Museum of Art Web page on Bloch's 1935 woodcut Land of Plenty'' (click on picture for larger image)
 Fresco workshop - Lucienne Block and Stephen Pope Dimitroff
 Archives of American Art, Smithsonian Institution: Oral History Interview

1909 births
1999 deaths
20th-century American painters
20th-century American photographers
20th-century American women photographers
Swiss emigrants to the United States
Swiss Jews
American muralists
American people of Swiss-Jewish descent
American women painters
École des Beaux-Arts alumni
Federal Art Project artists
Jewish American artists
Women muralists
20th-century American Jews